Corona is a surname. Notable people with the surname include:

Achille Corona (1914–1979), Italian socialist politician, lawyer and journalist
Adriana Corona (born 1980), Mexican triathlete and gold medalist
Alberto Amaro Corona (born 1963), Mexican politician from the Party of the Democratic Revolution
Alejandro Corona (born 1976), former Mexican professional footballer
Alessandro Corona (born 1972), Italian rower
Alfonso Corona Blake (1919-1999), Mexican film director and screenwriter
Antonio Vega Corona (born 1965), Mexican politician affiliated with the National Action Party
Bert Corona (1918–2001), United States labor and civil rights leader
Cayetano Corona Gaspariano, Mexican potter and Grand Master of Mexican Popular Arts 
David Barron Corona (1963-1987),  Mexican criminal
Eduardo José Corona (1925–2008), Portuguese footballer 
Fabrizio Corona (born 1974), Italian photographer, media personality and actor
Fernando Corona (born 1970), Mexican electronica artist known as "Murcof"
Heriberto Jara Corona (1879–1968), Mexican revolutionary and politician
Isabela Corona (1913–1993), Mexican actress
Javier Corona (1927–2003), Mexican–American diplomat and restaurateur
Jesús García Corona (1881-1907), Mexican railroad brakeman died while preventing a dynamite train explosion
Jesús Manuel Corona  (born 1993), Mexican football winger
Joe Corona (born 1990), United States professional soccer player 
John Corona (born 1988), United States ice dancer
Jose Corona Nuñez (1906-2002), Mexican author, anthropologist and history professor 
José de Jesús Corona (born 1981), Mexican footballer
José Llopis Corona (1918–2011), Spanish footballer 
Juan Corona (1934-2019), Mexican-American serial killer
Leonardo Corona (1561–1605), Italian Renaissance painter
Leandro Coronas Ávila (born 1971), Brazilian former professional footballer
Leticia Gutiérrez Corona (born 1951), Mexican politician affiliated with the New Alliance Party
Livia Corona Benjamin (born 1975), Mexican artist
Luis Rodolfo Abinader Corona (born 1967), current president of the Dominican Republic
Manuel Corona (1880–1950), Cuban musician
Manuel Gerardo Corona (born 1983), former Mexican-German footballer
María Corona Nakamura (born 1964), Mexican politician affiliated with the PRI
Pio Alberto del Corona (1837-1912),  Roman Catholic Italian prelate and the founder of the Suore Domenicane dello Spirito Santo
Puccio Corona (1942–2013), Italian journalist and television presenter
Ramón Corona (1837-1889), Mexican general and diplomat
Renato Corona (1948–2016), former Chief Justice of the Supreme Court of the Philippines
Rene Corona (born 1984), United States soccer player
Salvador Corona (1895–1990), Mexican–American bullfighter and artist
Sebastián Corona (born 1976), retired Spanish footballer 
Theodor Corona Musachi (or Teodor III Muzaka; died 1449), Albanian nobleman
Vittorio Corona (1948–2007), Italian journalist
Yasser Corona (born 1987), Mexican footballer

See also
Corona (disambiguation)